Tigana is a small town and principal settlement of the commune of Sidibela in the Cercle of Bafoulabé in the Kayes Region of south-western Mali.

References

Populated places in Kayes Region